James Cunningham (August 1, 1834 – May 4, 1925) was a Canadian merchant and Liberal politician, who represented New Westminster in the House of Commons of Canada during the 3rd Parliament from 1874 to 1878.

Born in Anyevny, County Monaghan, Ireland, the son of James Cunningham, he was educated in Anyevny, later coming to Canada and entering business as a merchant in New Westminster. In 1864, Cunningham married Mary Ann Woodman. He resigned his seat in the House of Commons in 1878. He sat as MLA for New Westminster City from 1884 to 1886. In 1873, he also served as the first Mayor of New Westminster. Cunningham died in New Westminster at the age of 91.

His brother Thomas served in the British Columbia assembly.

References 

1834 births
1925 deaths
Politicians from County Monaghan
Canadian people of Ulster-Scottish descent
Members of the House of Commons of Canada from British Columbia
Mayors of New Westminster
Liberal Party of Canada MPs
Members of the Legislative Assembly of British Columbia
Irish emigrants to pre-Confederation British Columbia